Bakhtiyar (died 978), better known by his laqab of Izz al-Dawla, was the Buyid amir of Iraq (967–978).

Early life 

Izz al-Dawla was born as Bakhtiyar, and was the son of Mu'izz al-Dawla. He also had three brothers named Sanad al-Dawla, Marzuban and Abu Ishaq Ibrahim. Bakhtiyar, during his early life, married a daughter of the Dailamite officer Lashkarwarz.

In the spring of 955, Mu'izz al-Dawla became very ill and decided to name his son as his successor. Five years later, the caliph officially recognized this by granting Bakhtiyar the title of "Izz al-Dawla". During his father's military expeditions, Izz al-Dawla ruled in Baghdad. Mu'izz al-Dawla died in 967, leaving behind several pieces of advice for his son. He recommended keeping the services of the Turkish commander Sebük-Tegin, respecting the wishes of the Turks, recognizing his uncle Rukn al-Dawla, who ruled northern Persia, as senior amir, and respecting his cousin 'Adud al-Dawla, who ruled from Fars. He also gave a strategy for dealing with the Hamdanid emir of Mosul, Abu Taghlib.

Reign 

In 970, Izz al-Dawla, in order to end the hostilities between the Dailamites and Turks in his army, began to make several marriages with high ranking Turks to strengthen the Dailamite-Turkic relationship; his son Marzuban ibn Bakhtiyar married a daughter of Bukhtakin Azadruwayh, and his other son Salar married a daughter of Baktijur.

Izz al-Dawla continued his father's policy of fighting the Shahinids who ruled the Iraqi marshlands, but he was unable to overcome them. At the same time, he ignored the border with the Byzantine Empire, considering this to be a matter for the caliph to handle. When the Byzantines under John I Tzimisces overran much of northern Mesopotamia in 971, he did not even return to Baghdad. The person who took it upon himself to defend Iraq was Sebük-Tegin, who felt himself increasingly alienated from the Buyid. Two years later, Izz al-Dawla appointed Ibn Baqiyya as his vizier.

Izz al-Dawla also had financial problems; in 973 he invaded the Amirate of Mosul, against the advice his father had left him. The campaign was a disaster; the Hamdanids under Abu Taghlib marched on Baghdad, while Sebük-Tegin was probably secretly supporting them. The Buyid amir then tried to solve his financial difficulties by seizing the Turkish fiefs, most of which were in Khuzestan. At the same time, he dismissed Sebük-Tegin from his post. The Turk revolted, forcing Izz al-Dawla to entrench himself in Wasit. He rejected Sebük-Tegin's offer to relinquish Baghdad in exchange for southern Iraq. The Turk then marched on Wasit, and laid siege to the city.

At this point, Rukn al-Dawla ordered 'Adud al-Dawla to march on Wasit and relieve Izz al-Dawla. The choice of 'Adud al-Dawla was somewhat curious: he had earlier advocated the removal of Izz al-Dawla due to the latter's perceived incompetence, and had granted asylum to a brother of the Iraqi amir that had launched a failed rebellion in Basra. Despite this, 'Adud al-Dawla complied with the order, although he traveled as slowly as possible in order to give Sebük-Tegin the chance to overpower Wasit.

Izz al-Dawla, however, managed to hold out, and Sebük-Tegin died during the siege. 'Adud al-Dawla therefore eventually decided to restore him in Baghdad. Shortly afterwards however, a revolt launched by Izz al-Dawla's Dailamite mercenaries gave 'Adud al-Dawla the opportunity to overthrow his cousin. Having done so, he would have ruled Iraq directly, but Rukn al-Dawla vehemently opposed this. Izz al-Dawla was therefore made 'Adud al-Dawla's viceroy to Iraq. The latter's departure for Shiraz prompted Izz al-Dawla to immediately revoke his subservience.

Civil war and death 
Rukn al-Dawla died in 976, throwing the Buyid empire into chaos. Izz al-Dawla refused to recognize 'Adud al-Dawla's succession to the position of senior amir. He took new titles for himself, and married one of the caliph's daughters, signifying the caliph's assent to his policy. 'Adud al-Dawla then prepared to invade Iraq. Despite having prepared his army and his allies, Izz al-Dawla was defeated in Khuzestan in 977 and was forced to retreat to Wasit. There he raised a new army, but the two cousins then entered into negotiations. After a long while, Izz al-Dawla was granted freedom of passage to Syria, in exchange for a promise not to ally with the Hamdanids. When he broke that agreement, hostilities were resumed. Both Izz al-Dawla and the Hamdanids were defeated in Samarra in the spring of 978, and the Buyid was captured. He was put to death soon after with 'Adud al-Dawla's consent.

References

Sources

External links 
 

978 deaths
Buyid emirs of Iraq
Year of birth unknown
10th-century rulers in Asia
10th-century Iranian people
People from Ahvaz
Amir al-umara of the Abbasid Caliphate